Oakenden is a rural locality in the Mackay Region, Queensland, Australia.

History 
Oakenden State School opened on 14 November 1910.

Education 
Oakenden State School is a government primary (Prep-6) school for boys and girls at 177 Oakenden School Road. In 2018, the school had an enrolment of 12 students with 2 teachers (1 full-time equivalent) and 5 non-teaching staff (2 full-time equivalent).

There is no secondary school in the locality. The nearest are Sarina State High School in Sarina to the south-east, Mirani State High School in Mirani to the north-west and Mackay State High School in Mackay to the north-east.

Amenities 
The Mackay Regional Council operates a mobile library service on a fortnightly schedule at Oakenden School Road.

References 

Mackay Region
Localities in Queensland